Takahiwai  is a rural community west of Marsden Bay, in the Whangarei District and Northland Region of New Zealand's North Island.

The Takahiwai Hills, a series of ranges covered in vegetation, dominate the Takahiwai landscape. The ranges include the Takahiwai Forests, one of the largest areas of coastal kanuka forest in the world. Kauri-kanuka forest dominates many of the ridges.

The area has a local history of Māori settlement by the Patuharakeke people. Pakauhokio, at the western edge of the ranges, was a significant pā site. There is also evidence of pā sites further west along the ridge, and near the harbour coast.

The local Takahiwai Marae is a meeting place of the Ngātiwai hapū of Te Patuharakeke and the Ngāti Whātua hapū of Patuharakeke. The marae features the Rangiora meeting house.

References

Whangarei District
Populated places in the Northland Region